Minuscule 691 (in the Gregory-Aland numbering), ε1387 (von Soden), is a Greek minuscule manuscript of the New Testament, on parchment. Palaeographically it has been assigned to the 13th century. The manuscript has complex contents. Scrivener labelled it by 595e.

Description 

The codex contains the text of the four Gospels, on 275 parchment leaves (size ). The text is written in one column per page, 22 lines per page.

There are no references to the Eusebian Canons.

Text 

The Greek text of the codex is a representative of the Byzantine text-type. Hermann von Soden classified it to the textual family Kr. Kurt Aland placed it in Category V.

According to the Claremont Profile Method it represents textual family Kr in Luke 1 and Luke 20. In Luke 10 no profile was made. It is partly illegible in Luke 1.

History 

Scrivener dated the manuscript to the 14th century, Gregory dated it to the 13th or 14th century. Currently the manuscript is dated by the INTF to the 13th century.

The manuscript was bought from Spyridion Lambros from Athens in 1859, along with 22 other manuscripts of the New Testament (codices: 688, 689, 690, 692, 693, etc.).

It was added to the list of New Testament manuscript by Scrivener (595) and Gregory (691).

It was examined by Samuel Thomas Bloomfield and Dean Burgon.

The manuscript is currently housed at the British Library (Add MS 22739) in London.

See also 

 List of New Testament minuscules
 Biblical manuscript
 Textual criticism

References

Further reading 

 S. T. Bloomfield, Critical Annotations: Additional and Supplementary on the New Testament (1860)
 G. Milligan, The New Testament Documents: their Origin and Early History (London, 1913), p. 161

Greek New Testament minuscules
13th-century biblical manuscripts
British Library additional manuscripts